Italian moths represent about 4,959 different types of moths. The moths (mostly nocturnal) and butterflies (mostly diurnal) together make up the taxonomic order Lepidoptera.

This is a list of moth species (families beginning A-E) which have been recorded in Italy, including San Marino, Sardinia, Sicily and Vatican City. Other parts of the list are at List of moths of Italy

Adelidae
Adela albicinctella Mann, 1852
Adela australis (Heydenreich, 1851)
Adela croesella (Scopoli, 1763)
Adela cuprella (Denis & Schiffermüller, 1775)
Adela mazzolella (Hübner, 1801)
Adela paludicolella Zeller, 1850
Adela reaumurella (Linnaeus, 1758)
Adela violella (Denis & Schiffermüller, 1775)
Cauchas fibulella (Denis & Schiffermüller, 1775)
Cauchas leucocerella (Scopoli, 1763)
Cauchas rufifrontella (Treitschke, 1833)
Cauchas rufimitrella (Scopoli, 1763)
Nematopogon adansoniella (Villers, 1789)
Nematopogon metaxella (Hübner, 1813)
Nematopogon pilella (Denis & Schiffermüller, 1775)
Nematopogon prolai (Hartig, 1941)
Nematopogon robertella (Clerck, 1759)
Nematopogon schwarziellus Zeller, 1839
Nematopogon sericinellus Zeller, 1847
Nematopogon swammerdamella (Linnaeus, 1758)
Nemophora associatella (Zeller, 1839)
Nemophora barbatellus (Zeller, 1847)
Nemophora congruella (Zeller, 1839)
Nemophora cupriacella (Hübner, 1819)
Nemophora degeerella (Linnaeus, 1758)
Nemophora fasciella (Fabricius, 1775)
Nemophora metallica (Poda, 1761)
Nemophora minimella (Denis & Schiffermüller, 1775)
Nemophora ochsenheimerella (Hübner, 1813)
Nemophora prodigellus (Zeller, 1853)
Nemophora raddaella (Hübner, 1793)
Nemophora violellus (Herrich-Schäffer in Stainton, 1851)

Alucitidae
Alucita acutata Scholz & Jackh, 1994
Alucita bidentata Scholz & Jackh, 1994
Alucita cancellata (Meyrick, 1908)
Alucita cymatodactyla Zeller, 1852
Alucita desmodactyla Zeller, 1847
Alucita grammodactyla Zeller, 1841
Alucita hexadactyla Linnaeus, 1758
Alucita huebneri Wallengren, 1859
Alucita iberica Scholz & Jackh, 1994
Alucita major (Rebel, 1906)
Alucita palodactyla Zeller, 1847
Alucita tridentata Scholz & Jackh, 1994
Alucita zonodactyla Zeller, 1847
Pterotopteryx dodecadactyla Hübner, 1813

Argyresthiidae
Argyresthia abdominalis Zeller, 1839
Argyresthia albistria (Haworth, 1828)
Argyresthia aurulentella Stainton, 1849
Argyresthia bonnetella (Linnaeus, 1758)
Argyresthia brockeella (Hübner, 1813)
Argyresthia conjugella Zeller, 1839
Argyresthia curvella (Linnaeus, 1761)
Argyresthia fundella (Fischer von Röslerstamm, 1835)
Argyresthia goedartella (Linnaeus, 1758)
Argyresthia pruniella (Clerck, 1759)
Argyresthia pulchella Lienig & Zeller, 1846
Argyresthia pygmaeella (Denis & Schiffermüller, 1775)
Argyresthia retinella Zeller, 1839
Argyresthia semifusca (Haworth, 1828)
Argyresthia semitestacella (Curtis, 1833)
Argyresthia sorbiella (Treitschke, 1833)
Argyresthia spinosella Stainton, 1849
Argyresthia submontana Frey, 1871
Argyresthia amiantella (Zeller, 1847)
Argyresthia arceuthina Zeller, 1839
Argyresthia bergiella (Ratzeburg, 1840)
Argyresthia dilectella Zeller, 1847
Argyresthia glabratella (Zeller, 1847)
Argyresthia illuminatella Zeller, 1839
Argyresthia laevigatella Herrich-Schäffer, 1855
Argyresthia praecocella Zeller, 1839
Argyresthia trifasciata Staudinger, 1871

Autostichidae
Apatema apolausticum Gozmány, 1996
Apatema impunctella Amsel, 1940
Apatema mediopallidum Walsingham, 1900
Aprominta cryptogamarum (Milliere, 1872)
Deroxena venosulella (Moschler, 1862)
Donaspastus bosellii (Hartig, 1941)
Donaspastus liguricus Gozmány, 1977
Donaspastus pannonicus Gozmány, 1952
Dysspastus gracilellus (Turati, 1922)
Dysspastus hartigi Gozmány, 1977
Dysspastus mediterraneus (Gozmány, 1957)
Dysspastus perpygmaeella (Walsingham, 1901)
Holcopogon bubulcellus (Staudinger, 1859)
Nukusa praeditella (Rebel, 1891)
Oecia oecophila (Staudinger, 1876)
Oegoconia annae Sutter, 2007
Oegoconia caradjai Popescu-Gorj & Capuse, 1965
Oegoconia ceres Sutter, 2007
Oegoconia deauratella (Herrich-Schäffer, 1854)
Oegoconia huemeri Sutter, 2007
Oegoconia novimundi (Busck, 1915)
Oegoconia uralskella Popescu-Gorj & Capuse, 1965
Orpecovalva acantha (Gozmány, 1963)
Pantacordis pallida (Staudinger, 1876)
Symmoca achrestella Rebel, 1889
Symmoca caliginella Mann, 1867
Symmoca cinerariella (Mann, 1859)
Symmoca dolomitana Huemer & Gozmány, 1992
Symmoca italica Gozmány, 1962
Symmoca orphnella Rebel, 1893
Symmoca signatella Herrich-Schäffer, 1854
Symmoca signella (Hübner, 1796)
Symmoca tofosella Rebel, 1893
Symmocoides oxybiella (Milliere, 1872)
Telephirca quadrifariella (Mann, 1855)

Batrachedridae
Batrachedra parvulipunctella Chrétien, 1915
Batrachedra pinicolella (Zeller, 1839)
Batrachedra praeangusta (Haworth, 1828)

Bedelliidae
Bedellia ehikella Szocs, 1967
Bedellia somnulentella (Zeller, 1847)

Blastobasidae
Blastobasis huemeri Sinev, 1993
Blastobasis magna Amsel, 1952
Blastobasis phycidella (Zeller, 1839)
Hypatopa binotella (Thunberg, 1794)
Hypatopa inunctella Zeller, 1839
Tecmerium anthophaga (Staudinger, 1870)

Brachodidae
Brachodes appendiculata (Esper, 1783)
Brachodes flavescens (Turati, 1919)
Brachodes nana (Treitschke, 1834)
Brachodes powelli (Oberthur, 1922)
Brachodes pumila (Ochsenheimer, 1808)

Brahmaeidae
Brahmaea europaea Hartig, 1963
Lemonia dumi (Linnaeus, 1761)
Lemonia taraxaci (Denis & Schiffermüller, 1775)

Bucculatricidae
Bucculatrix absinthii Gartner, 1865
Bucculatrix albedinella (Zeller, 1839)
Bucculatrix albella Stainton, 1867
Bucculatrix albiguttella Milliere, 1886
Bucculatrix alpina Frey, 1870
Bucculatrix argentisignella Herrich-Schäffer, 1855
Bucculatrix artemisiella Herrich-Schäffer, 1855
Bucculatrix atagina Wocke, 1876
Bucculatrix bechsteinella (Bechstein & Scharfenberg, 1805)
Bucculatrix benacicolella Hartig, 1937
Bucculatrix bicolorella Chrétien, 1915
Bucculatrix cantabricella Chrétien, 1898
Bucculatrix cidarella (Zeller, 1839)
Bucculatrix clavenae Klimesch, 1950
Bucculatrix cristatella (Zeller, 1839)
Bucculatrix demaryella (Duponchel, 1840)
Bucculatrix fatigatella Heyden, 1863
Bucculatrix frangutella (Goeze, 1783)
Bucculatrix gnaphaliella (Treitschke, 1833)
Bucculatrix helichrysella Constant, 1889
Bucculatrix herbalbella Chrétien, 1915
Bucculatrix lavaterella Milliere, 1865
Bucculatrix maritima Stainton, 1851
Bucculatrix nigricomella (Zeller, 1839)
Bucculatrix noltei Petry, 1912
Bucculatrix ratisbonensis Stainton, 1861
Bucculatrix santolinella Walsingham, 1898
Bucculatrix telavivella Amsel, 1935
Bucculatrix thoracella (Thunberg, 1794)
Bucculatrix ulmella Zeller, 1848
Bucculatrix ulmifoliae M. Hering, 1931

Carposinidae
Carposina berberidella Herrich-Schäffer, 1854

Castniidae
Paysandisia archon (Burmeister, 1880)

Chimabachidae
Dasystoma salicella (Hübner, 1796)
Diurnea fagella (Denis & Schiffermüller, 1775)
Diurnea lipsiella (Denis & Schiffermüller, 1775)

Choreutidae
Anthophila fabriciana (Linnaeus, 1767)
Choreutis diana (Hübner, 1822)
Choreutis nemorana (Hübner, 1799)
Choreutis pariana (Clerck, 1759)
Prochoreutis holotoxa (Meyrick, 1903)
Prochoreutis myllerana (Fabricius, 1794)
Prochoreutis stellaris (Zeller, 1847)
Tebenna bjerkandrella (Thunberg, 1784)
Tebenna micalis (Mann, 1857)
Tebenna pretiosana (Duponchel, 1842)

Cimeliidae
Axia margarita (Hübner, 1813)

Coleophoridae
Augasma aeratella (Zeller, 1839)
Coleophora absinthii Wocke, 1877
Coleophora acrisella Milliere, 1872
Coleophora acutiphaga Baldizzone, 1982
Coleophora adelogrammella Zeller, 1849
Coleophora adjectella Hering, 1937
Coleophora adjunctella Hodgkinson, 1882
Coleophora adspersella Benander, 1939
Coleophora aestuariella Bradley, 1984
Coleophora aethiops Wocke, 1877
Coleophora afrosarda Baldizzone & Kaltenbach, 1983
Coleophora ahenella Heinemann, 1877
Coleophora albella (Thunberg, 1788)
Coleophora albicans Zeller, 1849
Coleophora albicella Constant, 1885
Coleophora albicosta (Haworth, 1828)
Coleophora albicostella (Duponchel, 1842)
Coleophora albidella (Denis & Schiffermüller, 1775)
Coleophora albilineella Toll, 1960
Coleophora albitarsella Zeller, 1849
Coleophora albulae Frey, 1880
Coleophora alcyonipennella (Kollar, 1832)
Coleophora aleramica Baldizzone & Stubner, 2007
Coleophora algeriensis Toll, 1952
Coleophora algidella Staudinger, 1857
Coleophora alnifoliae Barasch, 1934
Coleophora alticolella Zeller, 1849
Coleophora altivagella Toll, 1952
Coleophora amellivora Baldizzone, 1979
Coleophora anatipenella (Hübner, 1796)
Coleophora angustiorella Fuchs, 1903
Coleophora antennariella Herrich-Schäffer, 1861
Coleophora arctostaphyli Meder, 1934
Coleophora argenteonivea Walsingham, 1907
Coleophora argentula (Stephens, 1834)
Coleophora artemisicolella Bruand, 1855
Coleophora asteris Muhlig, 1864
Coleophora asthenella Constant, 1893
Coleophora astragalella Zeller, 1849
Coleophora auricella (Fabricius, 1794)
Coleophora badiipennella (Duponchel, 1843)
Coleophora ballotella (Fischer v. Röslerstamm, 1839)
Coleophora barbaricina Baldizzone, 1980
Coleophora bassii Baldizzone, 1989
Coleophora betulella Heinemann, 1877
Coleophora bifrondella Walsingham, 1891
Coleophora bilineatella Zeller, 1849
Coleophora bilineella Herrich-Schäffer, 1855
Coleophora binderella (Kollar, 1832)
Coleophora breviuscula Staudinger, 1880
Coleophora brunneosignata Toll, 1944
Coleophora caelebipennella Zeller, 1839
Coleophora caespititiella Zeller, 1839
Coleophora calycotomella Stainton, 1869
Coleophora cecidophorella Oudejans, 1972
Coleophora chamaedriella Bruand, 1852
Coleophora chiclanensis Hering, 1936
Coleophora chretieni Baldizzone, 1979
Coleophora chrysanthemi Hofmann, 1869
Coleophora ciconiella Herrich-Schäffer, 1855
Coleophora cinerea Toll, 1953
Coleophora colutella (Fabricius, 1794)
Coleophora congeriella Staudinger, 1859
Coleophora conspicuella Zeller, 1849
Coleophora conyzae Zeller, 1868
Coleophora coracipennella (Hübner, 1796)
Coleophora coronillae Zeller, 1849
Coleophora corsicella Walsingham, 1898
Coleophora coxi Baldizzone & van der Wolf, 2007
Coleophora crepidinella Zeller, 1847
Coleophora currucipennella Zeller, 1839
Coleophora cyrniella Rebel, 1926
Coleophora cythisanthi Baldizzone, 1978
Coleophora deauratella Lienig & Zeller, 1846
Coleophora delmastroella Baldizzone, 2000
Coleophora dentiferella Toll, 1952
Coleophora derasofasciella Klimesch, 1952
Coleophora deviella Zeller, 1847
Coleophora dianthi Herrich-Schäffer, 1855
Coleophora dianthivora Walsingham, 1901
Coleophora didymella Chrétien, 1899
Coleophora dignella Toll, 1961
Coleophora directella Zeller, 1849
Coleophora discordella Zeller, 1849
Coleophora ditella Zeller, 1849
Coleophora etrusca Baldizzone, 1990
Coleophora eupreta Walsingham, 1907
Coleophora expressella Klemensiewicz, 1902
Coleophora fiorii Toll, 1954
Coleophora flaviella Mann, 1857
Coleophora flavipennella (Duponchel, 1843)
Coleophora follicularis (Vallot, 1802)
Coleophora frankii Schmidt, 1886
Coleophora fretella Zeller, 1847
Coleophora fringillella Zeller, 1839
Coleophora frischella (Linnaeus, 1758)
Coleophora fuscociliella Zeller, 1849
Coleophora fuscocuprella Herrich-Schäffer, 1855
Coleophora galatellae Hering, 1942
Coleophora galbulipennella Zeller, 1838
Coleophora gallipennella (Hübner, 1796)
Coleophora gallurella Amsel, 1951
Coleophora gardesanella Toll, 1954
Coleophora gaviaepennella Toll, 1952
Coleophora genistae Stainton, 1857
Coleophora glaucicolella Wood, 1892
Coleophora glitzella Hofmann, 1869
Coleophora graminicolella Heinemann, 1876
Coleophora granulatella Zeller, 1849
Coleophora gryphipennella (Hübner, 1796)
Coleophora halophilella Zimmermann, 1926
Coleophora hartigi Toll, 1944
Coleophora helianthemella Milliere, 1870
Coleophora helichrysiella Krone, 1909
Coleophora hemerobiella (Scopoli, 1763)
Coleophora hieronella Zeller, 1849
Coleophora ibipennella Zeller, 1849
Coleophora insulicola Toll, 1942
Coleophora inulae Wocke, 1877
Coleophora juncicolella Stainton, 1851
Coleophora kautzi Rebel, 1933
Coleophora kroneella Fuchs, 1899
Coleophora kuehnella (Goeze, 1783)
Coleophora laricella (Hübner, 1817)
Coleophora lassella Staudinger, 1859
Coleophora lessinica Baldizzone, 1980
Coleophora limosipennella (Duponchel, 1843)
Coleophora lineolea (Haworth, 1828)
Coleophora linosyridella Fuchs, 1880
Coleophora linosyris Hering, 1937
Coleophora lithargyrinella Zeller, 1849
Coleophora lixella Zeller, 1849
Coleophora longicornella Constant, 1893
Coleophora lusciniaepennella (Treitschke, 1833)
Coleophora luteolella Staudinger, 1880
Coleophora lutipennella (Zeller, 1838)
Coleophora macedonica Toll, 1959
Coleophora marcarolensis Baldizzone, 2004
Coleophora maritimarum Baldizzone, 2004
Coleophora maritimella Newman, 1863
Coleophora mausolella Chrétien, 1908
Coleophora mayrella (Hübner, 1813)
Coleophora medelichensis Krone, 1908
Coleophora mediterranea Baldizzone, 1990
Coleophora meridionella Rebel, 1912
Coleophora micronotella Toll, 1956
Coleophora millefolii Zeller, 1849
Coleophora milvipennis Zeller, 1839
Coleophora moehringiae Burmann, 1967
Coleophora murciana Toll, 1960
Coleophora neli Baldizzone, 2000
Coleophora nepetellae Baldizzone & Nel, 2014
Coleophora niveicostella Zeller, 1839
Coleophora nubivagella Zeller, 1849
Coleophora nutantella Muhlig & Frey, 1857
Coleophora obscenella Herrich-Schäffer, 1855
Coleophora obtectella Zeller, 1849
Coleophora obviella Rebel, 1914
Coleophora occitana Baldizzone, 1989
Coleophora ochrea (Haworth, 1828)
Coleophora ochripennella Zeller, 1849
Coleophora ochroflava Toll, 1961
Coleophora onobrychiella Zeller, 1849
Coleophora ononidella Milliere, 1879
Coleophora onopordiella Zeller, 1849
Coleophora orbitella Zeller, 1849
Coleophora oriolella Zeller, 1849
Coleophora ornatipennella (Hübner, 1796)
Coleophora otidipennella (Hübner, 1817)
Coleophora pappiferella Hofmann, 1869
Coleophora paramayrella Nel, 1993
Coleophora paripennella Zeller, 1839
Coleophora partitella Zeller, 1849
Coleophora pennella (Denis & Schiffermüller, 1775)
Coleophora peribenanderi Toll, 1943
Coleophora peterseni Baldizzone, 1983
Coleophora praecursella Zeller, 1847
Coleophora pratella Zeller, 1871
Coleophora preisseckeri Toll, 1942
Coleophora prunifoliae Doets, 1944
Coleophora pseudociconiella Toll, 1952
Coleophora pseudoditella Baldizzone & Patzak, 1983
Coleophora pseudolinosyris Kasy, 1979
Coleophora pseudorepentis Toll, 1960
Coleophora pseudosquamosella Baldizzone & Nel, 2003
Coleophora ptarmicia Walsingham, 1910
Coleophora pulmonariella Ragonot, 1874
Coleophora pyrrhulipennella Zeller, 1839
Coleophora quadristraminella Toll, 1961
Coleophora ramosella Zeller, 1849
Coleophora ravillella Toll, 1961
Coleophora rectilineella Fischer v. Röslerstamm, 1843
Coleophora repentis Klimesch, 1947
Coleophora retrodentella Baldizzone & Nel, 2004
Coleophora rudella Toll, 1944
Coleophora salicorniae Heinemann & Wocke, 1877
Coleophora salinella Stainton, 1859
Coleophora santolinella Constant, 1890
Coleophora saponariella Heeger, 1848
Coleophora sardiniae Baldizzone, 1983
Coleophora sardocorsa Baldizzone, 1983
Coleophora saxicolella (Duponchel, 1843)
Coleophora scabrida Toll, 1959
Coleophora semicinerea Staudinger, 1859
Coleophora serinipennella Christoph, 1872
Coleophora serpylletorum Hering, 1889
Coleophora serratella (Linnaeus, 1761)
Coleophora settarii Wocke, 1877
Coleophora siccifolia Stainton, 1856
Coleophora silenella Herrich-Schäffer, 1855
Coleophora sisteronica Toll, 1961
Coleophora soffneriella Toll, 1961
Coleophora solenella Staudinger, 1859
Coleophora solitariella Zeller, 1849
Coleophora spinella (Schrank, 1802)
Coleophora spiraeella Rebel, 1916
Coleophora spumosella Staudinger, 1859
Coleophora squamella Constant, 1885
Coleophora squamosella Stainton, 1856
Coleophora sternipennella (Zetterstedt, 1839)
Coleophora striatipennella Nylander in Tengstrom, 1848
Coleophora striolatella Zeller, 1849
Coleophora succursella Herrich-Schäffer, 1855
Coleophora supinella Ortner, 1949
Coleophora sylvaticella Wood, 1892
Coleophora taeniipennella Herrich-Schäffer, 1855
Coleophora tamesis Waters, 1929
Coleophora tanaceti Muhlig, 1865
Coleophora taygeti Baldizzone, 1983
Coleophora therinella Tengstrom, 1848
Coleophora thurneri Glaser, 1969
Coleophora thymi Hering, 1942
Coleophora tolli Klimesch, 1951
Coleophora treskaensis Toll & Amsel, 1967
Coleophora trifariella Zeller, 1849
Coleophora trifolii (Curtis, 1832)
Coleophora trigeminella Fuchs, 1881
Coleophora trochilella (Duponchel, 1843)
Coleophora tyrrhaenica Amsel, 1951
Coleophora uliginosella Glitz, 1872
Coleophora unipunctella Zeller, 1849
Coleophora vacciniella Herrich-Schäffer, 1861
Coleophora valesianella Zeller, 1849
Coleophora variicornis Toll, 1952
Coleophora versurella Zeller, 1849
Coleophora vestianella (Linnaeus, 1758)
Coleophora vibicella (Hübner, 1813)
Coleophora vibicigerella Zeller, 1839
Coleophora vicinella Zeller, 1849
Coleophora violacea (Strom, 1783)
Coleophora virgatella Zeller, 1849
Coleophora virgaureae Stainton, 1857
Coleophora vitisella Gregson, 1856
Coleophora vulnerariae Zeller, 1839
Coleophora vulpecula Zeller, 1849
Coleophora wockeella Zeller, 1849
Coleophora zelleriella Heinemann, 1854
Coleophora zernyi Toll, 1944
Goniodoma auroguttella (Fischer v. Röslerstamm, 1841)
Goniodoma limoniella (Stainton, 1884)
Goniodoma millierella Ragonot, 1882
Goniodoma nemesi Capuse, 1970
Metriotes lutarea (Haworth, 1828)

Cosmopterigidae
Alloclita recisella Staudinger, 1859
Anatrachyntis badia (Hodges, 1962)
Ascalenia echidnias (Meyrick, 1891)
Ascalenia vanella (Frey, 1860)
Ascalenia vanelloides Gerasimov, 1930
Coccidiphila gerasimovi Danilevsky, 1950
Coccidiphila ledereriella (Zeller, 1850)
Cosmopterix athesiae Huemer & Koster, 2006
Cosmopterix coryphaea Walsingham, 1908
Cosmopterix crassicervicella Chrétien, 1896
Cosmopterix orichalcea Stainton, 1861
Cosmopterix pulchrimella Chambers, 1875
Cosmopterix scribaiella Zeller, 1850
Cosmopterix zieglerella (Hübner, 1810)
Eteobalea albiapicella (Duponchel, 1843)
Eteobalea alypella (Klimesch, 1946)
Eteobalea anonymella (Riedl, 1965)
Eteobalea dohrnii (Zeller, 1847)
Eteobalea intermediella (Riedl, 1966)
Eteobalea isabellella (O. G. Costa, 1836)
Eteobalea serratella (Treitschke, 1833)
Eteobalea siciliae (Riedl, 1966)
Eteobalea sumptuosella (Lederer, 1855)
Eteobalea tririvella (Staudinger, 1870)
Gisilia stereodoxa (Meyrick, 1925)
Hodgesiella rebeli (Krone, 1905)
Isidiella divitella (Constant, 1885)
Isidiella nickerlii (Nickerl, 1864)
Limnaecia phragmitella Stainton, 1851
Pancalia baldizzonella Riedl, 1994
Pancalia leuwenhoekella (Linnaeus, 1761)
Pancalia nodosella (Bruand, 1851)
Pancalia schwarzella (Fabricius, 1798)
Pyroderces argyrogrammos (Zeller, 1847)
Pyroderces brosi Riedl, 1969
Pyroderces caesaris Gozmány, 1957
Pyroderces klimeschi Rebel, 1938
Sorhagenia lophyrella (Douglas, 1846)
Sorhagenia rhamniella (Zeller, 1839)
Stagmatophora heydeniella (Fischer von Röslerstamm, 1838)
Vulcaniella cognatella Riedl, 1990
Vulcaniella extremella (Wocke, 1871)
Vulcaniella fiordalisa (Petry, 1904)
Vulcaniella grabowiella (Staudinger, 1859)
Vulcaniella pomposella (Zeller, 1839)

Cossidae
Acossus terebra (Denis & Schiffermüller, 1775)
Cossus cossus (Linnaeus, 1758)
Dyspessa aculeata Turati, 1909
Dyspessa ulula (Borkhausen, 1790)
Parahypopta caestrum (Hübner, 1808)
Phragmataecia castaneae (Hübner, 1790)
Stygia australis Latreille, 1804
Zeuzera pyrina (Linnaeus, 1761)

Crambidae
Acentria ephemerella (Denis & Schiffermüller, 1775)
Achyra nudalis (Hübner, 1796)
Agriphila argentistrigellus (Ragonot, 1888)
Agriphila biarmicus (Tengstrom, 1865)
Agriphila brioniellus (Zerny, 1914)
Agriphila cyrenaicellus (Ragonot, 1887)
Agriphila dalmatinellus (Hampson, 1900)
Agriphila deliella (Hübner, 1813)
Agriphila geniculea (Haworth, 1811)
Agriphila inquinatella (Denis & Schiffermüller, 1775)
Agriphila latistria (Haworth, 1811)
Agriphila paleatellus (Zeller, 1847)
Agriphila poliellus (Treitschke, 1832)
Agriphila selasella (Hübner, 1813)
Agriphila straminella (Denis & Schiffermüller, 1775)
Agriphila tersellus (Lederer, 1855)
Agriphila tolli (Błeszyński, 1952)
Agriphila trabeatellus (Herrich-Schäffer, 1848)
Agriphila tristella (Denis & Schiffermüller, 1775)
Agrotera nemoralis (Scopoli, 1763)
Anania coronata (Hufnagel, 1767)
Anania crocealis (Hübner, 1796)
Anania funebris (Strom, 1768)
Anania fuscalis (Denis & Schiffermüller, 1775)
Anania hortulata (Linnaeus, 1758)
Anania lancealis (Denis & Schiffermüller, 1775)
Anania luctualis (Hübner, 1793)
Anania oberthuri (Turati, 1913)
Anania stachydalis (Germar, 1821)
Anania terrealis (Treitschke, 1829)
Anania testacealis (Zeller, 1847)
Anania verbascalis (Denis & Schiffermüller, 1775)
Anarpia incertalis (Duponchel, 1832)
Ancylolomia disparalis Hübner, 1825
Ancylolomia inornata Staudinger, 1870
Ancylolomia palpella (Denis & Schiffermüller, 1775)
Ancylolomia pectinatellus (Zeller, 1847)
Ancylolomia tentaculella (Hübner, 1796)
Ancylolomia tripolitella Rebel, 1909
Angustalius malacellus (Duponchel, 1836)
Antigastra catalaunalis (Duponchel, 1833)
Aporodes floralis (Hübner, 1809)
Arnia nervosalis Guenée, 1849
Atralata albofascialis (Treitschke, 1829)
Calamotropha aureliellus (Fischer v. Röslerstamm, 1841)
Calamotropha fuscilineatellus (D. Lucas, 1938)
Calamotropha paludella (Hübner, 1824)
Cataclysta lemnata (Linnaeus, 1758)
Catharia pyrenaealis (Duponchel, 1843)
Catharia simplonialis (Heydenreich, 1851)
Catoptria acutangulellus (Herrich-Schäffer, 1847)
Catoptria combinella (Denis & Schiffermüller, 1775)
Catoptria conchella (Denis & Schiffermüller, 1775)
Catoptria corsicellus (Duponchel, 1836)
Catoptria dimorphellus (Staudinger, 1882)
Catoptria europaeica Błeszyński, 1965
Catoptria falsella (Denis & Schiffermüller, 1775)
Catoptria fulgidella (Hübner, 1813)
Catoptria furcatellus (Zetterstedt, 1839)
Catoptria gozmanyi Błeszyński, 1956
Catoptria languidellus (Zeller, 1863)
Catoptria luctiferella (Hübner, 1813)
Catoptria lythargyrella (Hübner, 1796)
Catoptria maculalis (Zetterstedt, 1839)
Catoptria margaritella (Denis & Schiffermüller, 1775)
Catoptria myella (Hübner, 1796)
Catoptria mytilella (Hübner, 1805)
Catoptria orobiella Huemer & Tarmann, 1994
Catoptria osthelderi (Lattin, 1950)
Catoptria permutatellus (Herrich-Schäffer, 1848)
Catoptria petrificella (Hübner, 1796)
Catoptria pinella (Linnaeus, 1758)
Catoptria pyramidellus (Treitschke, 1832)
Catoptria radiella (Hübner, 1813)
Catoptria spatulelloides Błeszyński, 1965
Catoptria spatulellus (Turati, 1919)
Catoptria speculalis Hübner, 1825
Catoptria staudingeri (Zeller, 1863)
Catoptria verellus (Zincken, 1817)
Catoptria zermattensis (Frey, 1870)
Chilo luteellus (Motschulsky, 1866)
Chilo phragmitella (Hübner, 1805)
Chilo pulverosellus Ragonot, 1895
Cholius luteolaris (Scopoli, 1772)
Chrysocrambus brutiellus Bassi, 1985
Chrysocrambus craterella (Scopoli, 1763)
Chrysocrambus linetella (Fabricius, 1781)
Chrysocrambus sardiniellus (Turati, 1911)
Chrysoteuchia culmella (Linnaeus, 1758)
Cleptotypodes ledereri (Staudinger, 1870)
Cornifrons ulceratalis Lederer, 1858
Crambus alienellus Germar & Kaulfuss, 1817
Crambus ericella (Hübner, 1813)
Crambus hamella (Thunberg, 1788)
Crambus heringiellus Herrich-Schäffer, 1848
Crambus lathoniellus (Zincken, 1817)
Crambus pascuella (Linnaeus, 1758)
Crambus perlella (Scopoli, 1763)
Crambus pratella (Linnaeus, 1758)
Crambus silvella (Hübner, 1813)
Crambus uliginosellus Zeller, 1850
Cybalomia lutosalis (Mann, 1862)
Cynaeda dentalis (Denis & Schiffermüller, 1775)
Diasemia reticularis (Linnaeus, 1761)
Diasemiopsis ramburialis (Duponchel, 1834)
Dolicharthria bruguieralis (Duponchel, 1833)
Dolicharthria punctalis (Denis & Schiffermüller, 1775)
Donacaula forficella (Thunberg, 1794)
Donacaula mucronella (Denis & Schiffermüller, 1775)
Duponchelia fovealis Zeller, 1847
Ecpyrrhorrhoe diffusalis (Guenée, 1854)
Ecpyrrhorrhoe rubiginalis (Hübner, 1796)
Elophila nymphaeata (Linnaeus, 1758)
Elophila rivulalis (Duponchel, 1834)
Epascestria pustulalis (Hübner, 1823)
Ephelis cruentalis (Geyer, 1832)
Euchromius anapiellus (Zeller, 1847)
Euchromius bella (Hübner, 1796)
Euchromius cambridgei (Zeller, 1867)
Euchromius gozmanyi Błeszyński, 1961
Euchromius gratiosella (Caradja, 1910)
Euchromius mouchai Błeszyński, 1961
Euchromius ocellea (Haworth, 1811)
Euchromius ramburiellus (Duponchel, 1836)
Euchromius rayatellus (Amsel, 1949)
Euchromius superbellus (Zeller, 1849)
Euchromius vinculellus (Zeller, 1847)
Eudonia angustea (Curtis, 1827)
Eudonia delunella (Stainton, 1849)
Eudonia lacustrata (Panzer, 1804)
Eudonia laetella (Zeller, 1846)
Eudonia lineola (Curtis, 1827)
Eudonia mercurella (Linnaeus, 1758)
Eudonia murana (Curtis, 1827)
Eudonia pallida (Curtis, 1827)
Eudonia petrophila (Standfuss, 1848)
Eudonia phaeoleuca (Zeller, 1846)
Eudonia sudetica (Zeller, 1839)
Eudonia truncicolella (Stainton, 1849)
Eudonia vallesialis (Duponchel, 1832)
Eurrhypis guttulalis (Herrich-Schäffer, 1848)
Eurrhypis pollinalis (Denis & Schiffermüller, 1775)
Evergestis aenealis (Denis & Schiffermüller, 1775)
Evergestis africalis (Guenée, 1854)
Evergestis caesialis (Herrich-Schäffer, 1849)
Evergestis desertalis (Hübner, 1813)
Evergestis extimalis (Scopoli, 1763)
Evergestis forficalis (Linnaeus, 1758)
Evergestis frumentalis (Linnaeus, 1761)
Evergestis isatidalis (Duponchel, 1833)
Evergestis limbata (Linnaeus, 1767)
Evergestis mundalis (Guenée, 1854)
Evergestis pallidata (Hufnagel, 1767)
Evergestis politalis (Denis & Schiffermüller, 1775)
Evergestis segetalis (Herrich-Schäffer, 1851)
Evergestis sophialis (Fabricius, 1787)
Friedlanderia cicatricella (Hübner, 1824)
Gesneria centuriella (Denis & Schiffermüller, 1775)
Heliothela wulfeniana (Scopoli, 1763)
Hellula undalis (Fabricius, 1781)
Hodebertia testalis (Fabricius, 1794)
Hydriris ornatalis (Duponchel, 1832)
Hyperlais argillacealis (Zeller, 1847)
Hyperlais dulcinalis (Treitschke, 1835)
Hyperlais nemausalis (Duponchel, 1834)
Loxostege aeruginalis (Hübner, 1796)
Loxostege deliblatica Szent-Ivany & Uhrik-Meszaros, 1942
Loxostege fascialis (Hübner, 1796)
Loxostege manualis (Geyer, 1832)
Loxostege sticticalis (Linnaeus, 1761)
Loxostege turbidalis (Treitschke, 1829)
Loxostege virescalis (Guenée, 1854)
Mecyna asinalis (Hübner, 1819)
Mecyna flavalis (Denis & Schiffermüller, 1775)
Mecyna lutealis (Duponchel, 1833)
Mecyna trinalis (Denis & Schiffermüller, 1775)
Mesocrambus candiellus (Herrich-Schäffer, 1848)
Mesocrambus tamsi Błeszyński, 1960
Metacrambus carectellus (Zeller, 1847)
Metacrambus marabut Błeszyński, 1965
Metacrambus pallidellus (Duponchel, 1836)
Metacrambus salahinellus (Chrétien, 1917)
Metasia carnealis (Treitschke, 1829)
Metasia corsicalis (Duponchel, 1833)
Metasia cyrnealis Schawerda, 1926
Metasia olbienalis Guenée, 1854
Metasia ophialis (Treitschke, 1829)
Metasia suppandalis (Hübner, 1823)
Metaxmeste cinerealis (Della Beffa, 1942)
Metaxmeste phrygialis (Hübner, 1796)
Metaxmeste schrankiana (Hochenwarth, 1785)
Nascia cilialis (Hübner, 1796)
Nomophila noctuella (Denis & Schiffermüller, 1775)
Nymphula nitidulata (Hufnagel, 1767)
Orenaia alpestralis (Fabricius, 1787)
Orenaia andereggialis (Herrich-Schäffer, 1851)
Orenaia helveticalis (Herrich-Schäffer, 1851)
Orenaia lugubralis (Lederer, 1857)
Ostrinia nubilalis (Hübner, 1796)
Ostrinia palustralis (Hübner, 1796)
Ostrinia quadripunctalis (Denis & Schiffermüller, 1775)
Palepicorsia ustrinalis (Christoph, 1877)
Palpita vitrealis (Rossi, 1794)
Paracorsia repandalis (Denis & Schiffermüller, 1775)
Parapoynx fluctuosalis (Zeller, 1852)
Parapoynx stratiotata (Linnaeus, 1758)
Paratalanta hyalinalis (Hübner, 1796)
Paratalanta pandalis (Hübner, 1825)
Pediasia aridella (Thunberg, 1788)
Pediasia contaminella (Hübner, 1796)
Pediasia desertellus (Lederer, 1855)
Pediasia fascelinella (Hübner, 1813)
Pediasia luteella (Denis & Schiffermüller, 1775)
Pediasia matricella (Treitschke, 1832)
Pediasia pedriolellus (Duponchel, 1836)
Pediasia siculellus (Duponchel, 1836)
Platytes alpinella (Hübner, 1813)
Platytes cerussella (Denis & Schiffermüller, 1775)
Pleuroptya balteata (Fabricius, 1798)
Pleuroptya ruralis (Scopoli, 1763)
Psammotis pulveralis (Hübner, 1796)
Pseudobissetia terrestrellus (Christoph, 1885)
Pyrausta aerealis (Hübner, 1793)
Pyrausta aurata (Scopoli, 1763)
Pyrausta castalis Treitschke, 1829
Pyrausta cingulata (Linnaeus, 1758)
Pyrausta coracinalis Leraut, 1982
Pyrausta despicata (Scopoli, 1763)
Pyrausta falcatalis Guenée, 1854
Pyrausta limbopunctalis (Herrich-Schäffer, 1849)
Pyrausta nigrata (Scopoli, 1763)
Pyrausta obfuscata (Scopoli, 1763)
Pyrausta ostrinalis (Hübner, 1796)
Pyrausta porphyralis (Denis & Schiffermüller, 1775)
Pyrausta purpuralis (Linnaeus, 1758)
Pyrausta sanguinalis (Linnaeus, 1767)
Pyrausta virginalis Duponchel, 1832
Schoenobius gigantella (Denis & Schiffermüller, 1775)
Scirpophaga praelata (Scopoli, 1763)
Sclerocona acutella (Eversmann, 1842)
Scoparia ambigualis (Treitschke, 1829)
Scoparia ancipitella (La Harpe, 1855)
Scoparia basistrigalis Knaggs, 1866
Scoparia conicella (La Harpe, 1863)
Scoparia ingratella (Zeller, 1846)
Scoparia italica Turati, 1919
Scoparia manifestella (Herrich-Schäffer, 1848)
Scoparia perplexella (Zeller, 1839)
Scoparia pyralella (Denis & Schiffermüller, 1775)
Scoparia staudingeralis (Mabille, 1869)
Scoparia subfusca Haworth, 1811
Sitochroa palealis (Denis & Schiffermüller, 1775)
Sitochroa verticalis (Linnaeus, 1758)
Syrianarpia faunieralis Gianti, 2005
Talis quercella (Denis & Schiffermüller, 1775)
Tegostoma comparalis (Hübner, 1796)
Thisanotia chrysonuchella (Scopoli, 1763)
Thopeutis galleriellus (Ragonot, 1892)
Titanio normalis (Hübner, 1796)
Udea accolalis (Zeller, 1867)
Udea alpinalis (Denis & Schiffermüller, 1775)
Udea austriacalis (Herrich-Schäffer, 1851)
Udea bipunctalis (Herrich-Schäffer, 1851)
Udea carniolica Huemer & Tarmann, 1989
Udea cyanalis (La Harpe, 1855)
Udea decrepitalis (Herrich-Schäffer, 1848)
Udea elutalis (Denis & Schiffermüller, 1775)
Udea ferrugalis (Hübner, 1796)
Udea fulvalis (Hübner, 1809)
Udea inquinatalis (Lienig & Zeller, 1846)
Udea institalis (Hübner, 1819)
Udea lutealis (Hübner, 1809)
Udea murinalis (Fischer v. Röslerstamm, 1842)
Udea nebulalis (Hübner, 1796)
Udea numeralis (Hübner, 1796)
Udea olivalis (Denis & Schiffermüller, 1775)
Udea prunalis (Denis & Schiffermüller, 1775)
Udea rhododendronalis (Duponchel, 1834)
Udea scorialis (Zeller, 1847)
Udea simplicella (La Harpe, 1861)
Udea uliginosalis (Stephens, 1834)
Uresiphita gilvata (Fabricius, 1794)
Usgentia vespertalis (Herrich-Schäffer, 1851)
Xanthocrambus caducellus (Muller-Rutz, 1909)
Xanthocrambus delicatellus (Zeller, 1863)
Xanthocrambus lucellus (Herrich-Schäffer, 1848)
Xanthocrambus saxonellus (Zincken, 1821)

Douglasiidae
Klimeschia transversella (Zeller, 1839)
Tinagma balteolella (Fischer von Röslerstamm, 1841)
Tinagma dryadis Staudinger, 1872
Tinagma hedemanni (Caradja, 1920)
Tinagma ocnerostomella (Stainton, 1850)
Tinagma perdicella Zeller, 1839
Tinagma signatum Gaedike, 1991

Drepanidae
Achlya flavicornis (Linnaeus, 1758)
Asphalia ruficollis (Denis & Schiffermüller, 1775)
Cilix glaucata (Scopoli, 1763)
Cymatophorina diluta (Denis & Schiffermüller, 1775)
Drepana curvatula (Borkhausen, 1790)
Drepana falcataria (Linnaeus, 1758)
Falcaria lacertinaria (Linnaeus, 1758)
Habrosyne pyritoides (Hufnagel, 1766)
Ochropacha duplaris (Linnaeus, 1761)
Polyploca ridens (Fabricius, 1787)
Sabra harpagula (Esper, 1786)
Tethea ocularis (Linnaeus, 1767)
Tethea or (Denis & Schiffermüller, 1775)
Tetheella fluctuosa (Hübner, 1803)
Thyatira batis (Linnaeus, 1758)
Watsonalla binaria (Hufnagel, 1767)
Watsonalla cultraria (Fabricius, 1775)
Watsonalla uncinula (Borkhausen, 1790)

Elachistidae
Agonopterix adspersella (Kollar, 1832)
Agonopterix alpigena (Frey, 1870)
Agonopterix alstromeriana (Clerck, 1759)
Agonopterix angelicella (Hübner, 1813)
Agonopterix arenella (Denis & Schiffermüller, 1775)
Agonopterix aspersella (Constant, 1888)
Agonopterix assimilella (Treitschke, 1832)
Agonopterix astrantiae (Heinemann, 1870)
Agonopterix atomella (Denis & Schiffermüller, 1775)
Agonopterix cachritis (Staudinger, 1859)
Agonopterix capreolella (Zeller, 1839)
Agonopterix carduella (Hübner, 1817)
Agonopterix cervariella (Constant, 1884)
Agonopterix chironiella (Constant, 1893)
Agonopterix ciliella (Stainton, 1849)
Agonopterix cnicella (Treitschke, 1832)
Agonopterix conterminella (Zeller, 1839)
Agonopterix curvipunctosa (Haworth, 1811)
Agonopterix doronicella (Wocke, 1849)
Agonopterix ferocella (Chrétien, 1910)
Agonopterix ferulae (Zeller, 1847)
Agonopterix furvella (Treitschke, 1832)
Agonopterix graecella Hannemann, 1976
Agonopterix heracliana (Linnaeus, 1758)
Agonopterix hippomarathri (Nickerl, 1864)
Agonopterix hypericella (Hübner, 1817)
Agonopterix iliensis (Rebel, 1936)
Agonopterix irrorata (Staudinger, 1870)
Agonopterix kaekeritziana (Linnaeus, 1767)
Agonopterix laterella (Denis & Schiffermüller, 1775)
Agonopterix liturosa (Haworth, 1811)
Agonopterix multiplicella (Erschoff, 1877)
Agonopterix nanatella (Stainton, 1849)
Agonopterix nervosa (Haworth, 1811)
Agonopterix nodiflorella (Milliere, 1866)
Agonopterix ocellana (Fabricius, 1775)
Agonopterix oinochroa (Turati, 1879)
Agonopterix pallorella (Zeller, 1839)
Agonopterix parilella (Treitschke, 1835)
Agonopterix petasitis (Standfuss, 1851)
Agonopterix propinquella (Treitschke, 1835)
Agonopterix pupillana (Wocke, 1887)
Agonopterix purpurea (Haworth, 1811)
Agonopterix quadripunctata (Wocke, 1857)
Agonopterix rotundella (Douglas, 1846)
Agonopterix rutana (Fabricius, 1794)
Agonopterix scopariella (Heinemann, 1870)
Agonopterix selini (Heinemann, 1870)
Agonopterix senecionis (Nickerl, 1864)
Agonopterix silerella (Stainton, 1865)
Agonopterix squamosa (Mann, 1864)
Agonopterix subpropinquella (Stainton, 1849)
Agonopterix thapsiella (Zeller, 1847)
Agonopterix umbellana (Fabricius, 1794)
Agonopterix yeatiana (Fabricius, 1781)
Anchinia cristalis (Scopoli, 1763)
Anchinia daphnella (Denis & Schiffermüller, 1775)
Anchinia grandis Stainton, 1867
Anchinia grisescens Frey, 1856
Anchinia laureolella Herrich-Schäffer, 1854
Blastodacna atra (Haworth, 1828)
Blastodacna hellerella (Duponchel, 1838)
Cacochroa permixtella (Herrich-Schäffer, 1854)
Chrysoclista linneella (Clerck, 1759)
Depressaria absynthiella Herrich-Schäffer, 1865
Depressaria adustatella Turati, 1927
Depressaria albipunctella (Denis & Schiffermüller, 1775)
Depressaria artemisiae Nickerl, 1864
Depressaria badiella (Hübner, 1796)
Depressaria beckmanni Heinemann, 1870
Depressaria bupleurella Heinemann, 1870
Depressaria cervicella Herrich-Schäffer, 1854
Depressaria chaerophylli Zeller, 1839
Depressaria daucella (Denis & Schiffermüller, 1775)
Depressaria daucivorella Ragonot, 1889
Depressaria depressana (Fabricius, 1775)
Depressaria discipunctella Herrich-Schäffer, 1854
Depressaria douglasella Stainton, 1849
Depressaria emeritella Stainton, 1849
Depressaria halophilella Chrétien, 1908
Depressaria heydenii Zeller, 1854
Depressaria hofmanni Stainton, 1861
Depressaria incognitella Hannemann, 1990
Depressaria leucocephala Snellen, 1884
Depressaria libanotidella Schlager, 1849
Depressaria marcella Rebel, 1901
Depressaria olerella Zeller, 1854
Depressaria pimpinellae Zeller, 1839
Depressaria pulcherrimella Stainton, 1849
Depressaria radiella (Goeze, 1783)
Depressaria silesiaca Heinemann, 1870
Depressaria sordidatella Tengstrom, 1848
Depressaria tenebricosa Zeller, 1854
Depressaria veneficella Zeller, 1847
Depressaria venustella Hannemann, 1990
Depressaria zelleri Staudinger, 1879
Depressaria erinaceella Staudinger, 1870
Depressaria dictamnella (Treitschke, 1835)
Dystebenna stephensi (Stainton, 1849)
Elachista adscitella Stainton, 1851
Elachista agelensis Traugott-Olsen, 1996
Elachista argentella (Clerck, 1759)
Elachista atrisquamosa Staudinger, 1880
Elachista baldizzonei Traugott-Olsen, 1996
Elachista bedellella (Sircom, 1848)
Elachista bisulcella (Duponchel, 1843)
Elachista casascoensis Traugott-Olsen, 1992
Elachista catalana Parenti, 1978
Elachista chrysodesmella Zeller, 1850
Elachista collitella (Duponchel, 1843)
Elachista constitella Frey, 1859
Elachista disemiella Zeller, 1847
Elachista dispilella Zeller, 1839
Elachista dispunctella (Duponchel, 1843)
Elachista exigua Parenti, 1978
Elachista fasciola Parenti, 1983
Elachista galactitella (Eversmann, 1844)
Elachista gangabella Zeller, 1850
Elachista gormella Nielsen & Traugott-Olsen, 1987
Elachista heinemanni Frey, 1866
Elachista heringi Rebel, 1899
Elachista klimeschiella Parenti, 2002
Elachista littoricola Le Marchand, 1938
Elachista metella Kaila, 2002
Elachista nolckeni Sulcs, 1992
Elachista nuraghella Amsel, 1951
Elachista obliquella Stainton, 1854
Elachista occulta Parenti, 1978
Elachista ozeini Parenti, 2004
Elachista parvula Parenti, 1978
Elachista passerini Traugott-Olsen, 1996
Elachista pollinariella Zeller, 1839
Elachista pollutella Duponchel, 1843
Elachista pullicomella Zeller, 1839
Elachista revinctella Zeller, 1850
Elachista rudectella Stainton, 1851
Elachista spumella Caradja, 1920
Elachista squamosella (Duponchel, 1843)
Elachista subalbidella Schlager, 1847
Elachista subocellea (Stephens, 1834)
Elachista triseriatella Stainton, 1854
Elachista unifasciella (Haworth, 1828)
Elachista kalki Parenti, 1978
Elachista albicapilla Hofner, 1918
Elachista albidella Nylander, 1848
Elachista albifrontella (Hübner, 1817)
Elachista alpinella Stainton, 1854
Elachista anserinella Zeller, 1839
Elachista apicipunctella Stainton, 1849
Elachista argentifasciella Hofner, 1898
Elachista atricomella Stainton, 1849
Elachista biatomella (Stainton, 1848)
Elachista bifasciella Treitschke, 1833
Elachista boursini Amsel, 1951
Elachista brachypterella (Klimesch, 1990)
Elachista canapennella (Hübner, 1813)
Elachista cinereopunctella (Haworth, 1828)
Elachista compsa Traugott-Olsen, 1974
Elachista consortella Stainton, 1851
Elachista contaminatella Zeller, 1847
Elachista differens Parenti, 1978
Elachista dimicatella Rebel, 1903
Elachista elegans Frey, 1859
Elachista exactella (Herrich-Schäffer, 1855)
Elachista freyerella (Hübner, 1825)
Elachista fulgens Parenti, 1983
Elachista gleichenella (Fabricius, 1781)
Elachista griseella (Duponchel, 1843)
Elachista gruenewaldi Parenti, 2002
Elachista herrichii Frey, 1859
Elachista humilis Zeller, 1850
Elachista igaloensis Amsel, 1951
Elachista infuscata Frey, 1882
Elachista juliensis Frey, 1870
Elachista luticomella Zeller, 1839
Elachista maculicerusella (Bruand, 1859)
Elachista maculosella Chrétien, 1896
Elachista martinii O. Hofmann, 1898
Elachista morandinii Huemer & Kaila, 2003
Elachista nobilella Zeller, 1839
Elachista occidentalis Frey, 1882
Elachista ornithopodella Frey, 1859
Elachista orstadii N. Palm, 1943
Elachista pigerella (Herrich-Schäffer, 1854)
Elachista quadripunctella (Hübner, 1825)
Elachista rufocinerea (Haworth, 1828)
Elachista scirpi Stainton, 1887
Elachista serricornis Stainton, 1854
Elachista sicula Parenti, 1978
Elachista subnigrella Douglas, 1853
Elachista tetragonella (Herrich-Schäffer, 1855)
Elachista trapeziella Stainton, 1849
Elachista utonella Frey, 1856
Elachista zernyi Hartig, 1941
Ethmia aurifluella (Hübner, 1810)
Ethmia bipunctella (Fabricius, 1775)
Ethmia candidella (Alphéraky, 1908)
Ethmia chrysopyga (Zeller, 1844)
Ethmia chrysopygella (Kolenati, 1846)
Ethmia dodecea (Haworth, 1828)
Ethmia flavianella (Treitschke, 1832)
Ethmia haemorrhoidella (Eversmann, 1844)
Ethmia pusiella (Linnaeus, 1758)
Ethmia quadrillella (Goeze, 1783)
Ethmia terminella T. B. Fletcher, 1938
Exaeretia ciniflonella (Lienig & Zeller, 1846)
Exaeretia conciliatella (Rebel, 1892)
Exaeretia culcitella (Herrich-Schäffer, 1854)
Exaeretia lutosella (Herrich-Schäffer, 1854)
Exaeretia preisseckeri (Rebel, 1937)
Haplochrois albanica (Rebel & Zerny, 1932)
Haplochrois ochraceella (Rebel, 1903)
Heinemannia albidorsella (Staudinger, 1877)
Heinemannia festivella (Denis & Schiffermüller, 1775)
Heinemannia laspeyrella (Hübner, 1796)
Hypercallia citrinalis (Scopoli, 1763)
Levipalpus hepatariella (Lienig & Zeller, 1846)
Luquetia lobella (Denis & Schiffermüller, 1775)
Orophia denisella (Denis & Schiffermüller, 1775)
Orophia ferrugella (Denis & Schiffermüller, 1775)
Orophia mendosella (Zeller, 1868)
Orophia sordidella (Hübner, 1796)
Perittia echiella (de Joannis, 1902)
Perittia farinella (Thunberg, 1794)
Perittia herrichiella (Herrich-Schäffer, 1855)
Semioscopis avellanella (Hübner, 1793)
Semioscopis oculella (Thunberg, 1794)
Semioscopis steinkellneriana (Denis & Schiffermüller, 1775)
Semioscopis strigulana (Denis & Schiffermüller, 1775)
Spuleria flavicaput (Haworth, 1828)
Stephensia brunnichella (Linnaeus, 1767)
Telechrysis tripuncta (Haworth, 1828)

Endromidae
Endromis versicolora (Linnaeus, 1758)

Epermeniidae
Epermenia aequidentellus (E. Hofmann, 1867)
Epermenia chaerophyllella (Goeze, 1783)
Epermenia illigerella (Hübner, 1813)
Epermenia insecurella (Stainton, 1854)
Epermenia strictellus (Wocke, 1867)
Epermenia devotella (Heyden, 1863)
Epermenia iniquellus (Wocke, 1867)
Epermenia profugella (Stainton, 1856)
Epermenia theimeri Gaedike, 2001
Epermenia ochreomaculellus (Milliere, 1854)
Epermenia pontificella (Hübner, 1796)
Epermenia scurella (Stainton, 1851)
Ochromolopis ictella (Hübner, 1813)
Ochromolopis staintonellus (Milliere, 1869)
Phaulernis dentella (Zeller, 1839)
Phaulernis fulviguttella (Zeller, 1839)
Phaulernis rebeliella Gaedike, 1966
Phaulernis statariella (Heyden, 1863)

Erebidae
Amata kruegeri (Ragusa, 1904)
Amata phegea (Linnaeus, 1758)
Amata ragazzii (Turati, 1917)
Apaidia barbarica Durante, 1998
Apaidia mesogona (Godart, 1824)
Apaidia rufeola (Rambur, 1832)
Apopestes spectrum (Esper, 1787)
Araeopteron ecphaea Hampson, 1914
Arctia caja (Linnaeus, 1758)
Arctia festiva (Hufnagel, 1766)
Arctia flavia (Fuessly, 1779)
Arctia villica (Linnaeus, 1758)
Arctornis l-nigrum (Muller, 1764)
Atlantarctia tigrina (Villers, 1789)
Atolmis rubricollis (Linnaeus, 1758)
Autophila dilucida (Hübner, 1808)
Autophila hirsuta (Staudinger, 1870)
Autophila limbata (Staudinger, 1871)
Autophila rosea (Staudinger, 1888)
Autophila cataphanes (Hübner, 1813)
Callimorpha dominula (Linnaeus, 1758)
Calliteara pudibunda (Linnaeus, 1758)
Calymma communimacula (Denis & Schiffermüller, 1775)
Calyptra thalictri (Borkhausen, 1790)
Catephia alchymista (Denis & Schiffermüller, 1775)
Catocala coniuncta (Esper, 1787)
Catocala conversa (Esper, 1783)
Catocala dilecta (Hübner, 1808)
Catocala diversa (Geyer, 1828)
Catocala electa (Vieweg, 1790)
Catocala elocata (Esper, 1787)
Catocala fraxini (Linnaeus, 1758)
Catocala fulminea (Scopoli, 1763)
Catocala hymenaea (Denis & Schiffermüller, 1775)
Catocala lupina Herrich-Schäffer, 1851
Catocala nupta (Linnaeus, 1767)
Catocala nymphaea (Esper, 1787)
Catocala nymphagoga (Esper, 1787)
Catocala optata (Godart, 1824)
Catocala promissa (Denis & Schiffermüller, 1775)
Catocala puerpera (Giorna, 1791)
Catocala sponsa (Linnaeus, 1767)
Chelis maculosa (Gerning, 1780)
Chelis simplonica (Boisduval, 1840)
Clytie illunaris (Hübner, 1813)
Colobochyla salicalis (Denis & Schiffermüller, 1775)
Coscinia bifasciata (Rambur, 1832)
Coscinia cribraria (Linnaeus, 1758)
Coscinia libyssa (Pungeler, 1907)
Coscinia striata (Linnaeus, 1758)
Cybosia mesomella (Linnaeus, 1758)
Cymbalophora pudica (Esper, 1785)
Cymbalophora rivularis (Menetries, 1832)
Diacrisia sannio (Linnaeus, 1758)
Diaphora luctuosa (Hübner, 1831)
Diaphora mendica (Clerck, 1759)
Diaphora sordida (Hübner, 1803)
Dicallomera fascelina (Linnaeus, 1758)
Drasteria cailino (Lefebvre, 1827)
Dysauxes ancilla (Linnaeus, 1767)
Dysauxes famula (Freyer, 1836)
Dysauxes punctata (Fabricius, 1781)
Dysgonia algira (Linnaeus, 1767)
Dysgonia torrida (Guenée, 1852)
Eilema caniola (Hübner, 1808)
Eilema complana (Linnaeus, 1758)
Eilema depressa (Esper, 1787)
Eilema griseola (Hübner, 1803)
Eilema lurideola (Zincken, 1817)
Eilema lutarella (Linnaeus, 1758)
Eilema marcida (Mann, 1859)
Eilema palliatella (Scopoli, 1763)
Eilema pseudocomplana (Daniel, 1939)
Eilema pygmaeola (Doubleday, 1847)
Eilema rungsi Toulgoët, 1960
Eilema sororcula (Hufnagel, 1766)
Eilema uniola (Rambur, 1866)
Eublemma amoena (Hübner, 1803)
Eublemma candidana (Fabricius, 1794)
Eublemma caprearum Draudt, 1933
Eublemma elychrysi (Rambur, 1833)
Eublemma minutata (Fabricius, 1794)
Eublemma ostrina (Hübner, 1808)
Eublemma parva (Hübner, 1808)
Eublemma polygramma (Duponchel, 1842)
Eublemma pura (Hübner, 1813)
Eublemma purpurina (Denis & Schiffermüller, 1775)
Eublemma rosea (Hübner, 1790)
Eublemma scitula Rambur, 1833
Eublemma viridula (Guenée, 1841)
Euclidia mi (Clerck, 1759)
Euclidia glyphica (Linnaeus, 1758)
Euclidia triquetra (Denis & Schiffermüller, 1775)
Euplagia quadripunctaria (Poda, 1761)
Euproctis chrysorrhoea (Linnaeus, 1758)
Euproctis similis (Fuessly, 1775)
Exophyla rectangularis (Geyer, 1828)
Grammia quenseli (Paykull, 1791)
Grammodes bifasciata (Petagna, 1787)
Grammodes stolida (Fabricius, 1775)
Herminia flavicrinalis (Andreas, 1910)
Herminia grisealis (Denis & Schiffermüller, 1775)
Herminia tarsicrinalis (Knoch, 1782)
Herminia tarsipennalis (Treitschke, 1835)
Herminia tenuialis (Rebel, 1899)
Holoarctia cervini (Fallou, 1864)
Honeyania ragusana (Freyer, 1844)
Hypena crassalis (Fabricius, 1787)
Hypena lividalis (Hübner, 1796)
Hypena obesalis Treitschke, 1829
Hypena obsitalis (Hübner, 1813)
Hypena palpalis (Hübner, 1796)
Hypena proboscidalis (Linnaeus, 1758)
Hypena rostralis (Linnaeus, 1758)
Hypenodes humidalis Doubleday, 1850
Hypenodes kalchbergi Staudinger, 1876
Hyphantria cunea (Drury, 1773)
Hyphoraia aulica (Linnaeus, 1758)
Hyphoraia testudinaria (Geoffroy in Fourcroy, 1785)
Idia calvaria (Denis & Schiffermüller, 1775)
Laspeyria flexula (Denis & Schiffermüller, 1775)
Leucoma salicis (Linnaeus, 1758)
Lithosia quadra (Linnaeus, 1758)
Lygephila craccae (Denis & Schiffermüller, 1775)
Lygephila ludicra (Hübner, 1790)
Lygephila lusoria (Linnaeus, 1758)
Lygephila pastinum (Treitschke, 1826)
Lygephila procax (Hübner, 1813)
Lygephila viciae (Hübner, 1822)
Lymantria atlantica (Rambur, 1837)
Lymantria dispar (Linnaeus, 1758)
Lymantria lapidicola (Herrich-Schäffer, 1851)
Lymantria monacha (Linnaeus, 1758)
Macrochilo cribrumalis (Hübner, 1793)
Metachrostis dardouini (Boisduval, 1840)
Metachrostis velocior (Staudinger, 1892)
Metachrostis velox (Hübner, 1813)
Miltochrista miniata (Forster, 1771)
Minucia lunaris (Denis & Schiffermüller, 1775)
Nodaria nodosalis (Herrich-Schäffer, 1851)
Nudaria mundana (Linnaeus, 1761)
Ocneria ledereri (Milliere, 1869)
Ocneria rubea (Denis & Schiffermüller, 1775)
Ocnogyna baetica (Rambur, 1836)
Ocnogyna corsica (Rambur, 1832)
Ocnogyna parasita (Hübner, 1790)
Odice arcuinna (Hübner, 1790)
Odice jucunda (Hübner, 1813)
Odice suava (Hübner, 1813)
Ophiusa tirhaca (Cramer, 1773)
Orectis massiliensis (Milliere, 1864)
Orectis proboscidata (Herrich-Schäffer, 1851)
Orgyia corsica Boisduval, 1834
Orgyia dubia (Tauscher, 1806)
Orgyia recens (Hübner, 1819)
Orgyia rupestris Rambur, 1832
Orgyia trigotephras Boisduval, 1829
Orgyia antiqua (Linnaeus, 1758)
Paidia griseola Rothschild, 1933
Paidia rica (Freyer, 1858)
Pandesma robusta (Walker, 1858)
Paracolax tristalis (Fabricius, 1794)
Parascotia fuliginaria (Linnaeus, 1761)
Parascotia nisseni Turati, 1905
Parasemia plantaginis (Linnaeus, 1758)
Parocneria detrita (Esper, 1785)
Pechipogo plumigeralis Hübner, 1825
Pechipogo strigilata (Linnaeus, 1758)
Pelosia muscerda (Hufnagel, 1766)
Pelosia obtusa (Herrich-Schäffer, 1852)
Pelosia plumosa (Mabille, 1900)
Penthophera morio (Linnaeus, 1767)
Pericallia matronula (Linnaeus, 1758)
Phragmatobia fuliginosa (Linnaeus, 1758)
Phragmatobia luctifera (Denis & Schiffermüller, 1775)
Phytometra viridaria (Clerck, 1759)
Polypogon gryphalis (Herrich-Schäffer, 1851)
Polypogon tentacularia (Linnaeus, 1758)
Rhypagla lacernaria (Hübner, 1813)
Rhyparia purpurata (Linnaeus, 1758)
Rivula sericealis (Scopoli, 1763)
Schrankia costaestrigalis (Stephens, 1834)
Schrankia taenialis (Hübner, 1809)
Scoliopteryx libatrix (Linnaeus, 1758)
Setema cereola (Hübner, 1803)
Setina alpestris Zeller, 1865
Setina aurita (Esper, 1787)
Setina irrorella (Linnaeus, 1758)
Setina roscida (Denis & Schiffermüller, 1775)
Simplicia rectalis (Eversmann, 1842)
Spilosoma lubricipeda (Linnaeus, 1758)
Spilosoma lutea (Hufnagel, 1766)
Spilosoma urticae (Esper, 1789)
Tathorhynchus exsiccata (Lederer, 1855)
Thumatha senex (Hübner, 1808)
Trisateles emortualis (Denis & Schiffermüller, 1775)
Tyria jacobaeae (Linnaeus, 1758)
Utetheisa pulchella (Linnaeus, 1758)
Watsonarctia deserta (Bartel, 1902)
Zanclognatha lunalis (Scopoli, 1763)
Zanclognatha zelleralis (Wocke, 1850)
Zebeeba falsalis (Herrich-Schäffer, 1839)
Zekelita antiqualis (Hübner, 1809)
Zethes insularis Rambur, 1833

Eriocottidae
Eriocottis fuscanella Zeller, 1847
Dyseriocrania subpurpurella (Haworth, 1828)
Eriocrania cicatricella (Zetterstedt, 1839)
Eriocrania semipurpurella (Stephens, 1835)
Eriocrania sparrmannella (Bosc, 1791)
Paracrania chrysolepidella (Zeller, 1851)

Euteliidae
Eutelia adulatrix (Hübner, 1813)

See also
List of butterflies of Italy

External links
Fauna Europaea

Moths01
Italy01
Italy01